Haji Muhammad Amin Jan Kuchi is an Afghan Taliban politician who is currently serving as Governor of Maidan Wardak Province since 7 November 2021.

References

Living people
Taliban governors
Governors of Maidan Wardak Province
Year of birth missing (living people)